Statistics of Emperor's Cup in the 1958 season.

Overview
It was contested by 16 teams, and Kwangaku Club won the championship.

Results

1st Round
Toyama Shukyu-dan 0–6 Chuo University Club
Meiyu Club 0–2 Shida Soccer
Hakodate City Hall 1–6 Keio BRB
Nambu Shukyu-dan 0–18 Kwangaku Club
Nagoya Soccer 0–3 Toyo Industries
Kyoto Shiko 2–3 University of Tokyo LB
Kwangaku Club 5–1 Ehime Club
Waseda University 1–3 Yawata Steel

Quarterfinals
Chuo University Club 0–1 Shida Soccer
Keio BRB 0–1 Kwangaku Club
Toyo Industries 0–1 University of Tokyo LB
Kwangaku Club 0–2 Yawata Steel

Semifinals
Shida Soccer 0–3 Kwangaku Club
University of Tokyo LB 0–1 Yawata Steel

Final

Kwangaku Club 2–1 Yawata Steel
Kwangaku Club won the championship.

References
 NHK

Emperor's Cup
1958 in Japanese football